Herbert Kegel (29 July 1920 – 20 November 1990) was a German conductor.

Kegel was born in Dresden.  He studied conducting with Karl Böhm and composition with Boris Blacher at the Dresden Conservatory from 1935 to 1940. In 1946 he began conducting in Pirna and Rostock; and in 1948 he began a three-decade-long association with the Leipzig Radio Orchestra and Choir, of which he became the principal conductor in 1960. Meanwhile, in 1977 Kegel took the position of principal conductor of Dresden Philharmonic Orchestra, which he kept until 1985.

Kegel was married to the Italian soprano Celestina Casapietra from 1966 to 1983. Their son  is active as a singer, media presenter and actor.

In 1990, he died by suicide in Dresden.

References

External links 
 
 
 
  Herbert Kegel discography

1920 births
1990 suicides
Musicians from Dresden
German male conductors (music)
Recipients of the Patriotic Order of Merit in silver
Recipients of the National Prize of East Germany
Suicides in Germany
20th-century German conductors (music)
20th-century German male musicians
1990 deaths